Hopia obtusa is a species of grass commonly known as vine mesquite. This plant was treated as Panicum obtusum until recently when more molecular and genetic material revealed new information about it. Hopia obtusa is now placed in the monotypic genus Hopia.

Description
It has long, creeping rhizomes or shallow rhizomes with swollen, villous nodes. The culms are usually in small, compressed, glaucous clumps that are either erect or decumbent. Nodes are hairy lower on the plant but glabrous higher up. The sheath is pubescent to pilose lower on the plant but glabrous higher up. It has membranous truncate, irregularly denticulate ligules that are  big. The panicle has 2 to 6 spikelike, erect, puberulent, and 3-angled branches. The ultimate branchlets are one-sided. The pedicels are paired and congested. The lower glumes are about 3/4 as long as the spikelet and are 5- or 7-veined. Upper glumes and lower lemmas equal the spikelet's length and are 5– to 9-veined. The upper florets are puberulent at the bases and apices. Flowering is from May through October.

Habitat and ecology
Hopia obtusa grows in seasonally wet sand or gravel, especially on stream banks, ditches, roadsides, wet pastures, and rangeland. Its range extends from the southwestern United States to central Mexico.

It is a larval host to the dotted roadside skipper.

References

Panicoideae
Monotypic Poaceae genera
Flora of the United States
Flora of Mexico